Johan Pitka, VR I/1,  (also Juhan Pitka; 19 February 1872 – 22 November 1944) was an Estonian entrepreneur, sea captain and a rear admiral (1919). He was the Commander of the Estonian Navy in the Estonian War of Independence.

Johan Pitka was one of the main characters in organizing the Defence Forces of the newly established Estonian Republic in November 1918, at the end of World War I, when the German occupational forces started to move out of Estonia, and there was a threat of the invasion of the newly established Red Army. Johan Pitka was the creator and main organizer of the Estonian Defence League, Estonian armoured trains, armoured cars and the Estonian Navy. He was appointed the Commander of the Estonian Navy in December 1918 and led it through the victorious Estonian War of Independence without losing a ship.

Due to his commitment to his country, Johan Pitka is often called "the Spirit of the Estonian War of Independence" for this.

Early life
Pitka studied at Käsmu, Kuressaare and Paldiski marine schools and became a Master Mariner. From 1889 to 1907 he worked on sailing ships. In 1895 he was on the first sailing ship to transit Germany's Kiel Canal. From 1904-11, he lived in Great Britain. After the beginning of the 1917 Russian Revolution Pitka became active in society and started organizing returning Estonian soldiers who fought in the Russian Army during World War I. After the communists sentenced him to death he was forced to go underground. When the Germans occupied Estonia in 1918, Pitka began to organize the Defence League.

Estonian War of Independence

At the beginning of the Estonian War of Independence, the Defence League was one of the main forces of the Republic of Estonia, and at that time Pitka also started organising the armoured trains. The first armoured train was ready ten days after the beginning of the war, and the second became ready two weeks later. In total, 12 armoured trains were built during the war (only one was lost in battle), and they played a crucial role in the victory of the Estonian War of Independence. Many called Pitka "the father of the armoured trains" and "the Spirit of the War of Independence" for this.

Pitka was also one of the main organizers of the Estonian Navy. In December 1918 he became the Commander of the Estonian Navy and led it in all major operations including supporting the Estonian 1st Division in the capture of Narva from the Russian SFSR in January 1919 and supporting the Estonian 3rd Division by attacking Landeswehr naval fortifications at Riga in July 1919. In September 1919 he achieved the rank of a rear admiral. Pitka retired in November 1919. In 1920, for his service in the Baltic region during and after the 1917 Russian Revolution, Pitka was awarded a knighthood – Knight Commander of St. Michael and St. George (KCMG) – by Britain's King George V upon the recommendation of British Admiral Sir Walter Cowan.

Canada
As a former merchant seaman and Canadian Pacific Railway Co. representative, Pitka had some familiarity with Canada's immigration policies, the availability of land for homesteading and Canada's natural beauty. The promise of new roads in and extension of the railway caused Pitka to establish a settlement in the Sowchea area of Fort St. James, British Columbia. The Sowchea area was located on the other side of Stuart Lake from the Hudson Bay Company trading post.

On 3 April 1924, a group of Estonian settlers arrived in Fort St. James whose population was about 50 Caucasians and 500 indigenous natives. The initial settlers were Pitka's family consisting of: Lady Mari-Helene Pitka, sons Edward and Stanley, daughters Saima and Linda and son-in law Lt. Aleksander Päären; families Andrekson, Rosin and Saar; Col. Steinman, Mr. Nilk and Mr. Pärtelson with wives; and Messrs. Kuusk, Olem, Puhm, Sulakatk, Vaimel, Unger and Wilmanson. They began homesteading on more than 300 hectares of land. The Estonian settlers were happy living with the Hudson Bay officials, the local Dakelh people and other residents. Although they tried growing crops, sheep farming, dairy farming and sawmilling, a sustainable existence proved elusive, largely because it was extremely difficult to get their goods to market given a change in the Provincial Government and a devaluation of the Canadian dollar during the depression. The delayed local development and frustrating access to markets caused all members of the group to move elsewhere or return to Estonia by 1932. Landmarks around Fort St. James still bear their name (e.g. Pitka Mountain, Pitka Bay, Pitka Bay Resort, Lind(a) Lake, Colony Point and Paaren's Beach Provincial Park). In 2009 a monument honouring Pitka was unveiled in Fort St. James.

Upon return to Estonia, some prosperous years followed for the Pitkas. Johan Pitka was one of the leaders of the League of Liberators for a short time but left the organisation in 1932. In 1937 he was also a member of the National Constituent Assembly (Rahvuskogu). After the Soviet occupation in June 1940, Pitka escaped from Estonia to Finland. In 1941 tragedy struck the Pitka family, their three sons were arrested by the Soviet occupiers and perished. In 1944 Pitka returned to Estonia to organize military resistance to fight for Estonia's independence. Pitka is thought to have died in a 1944 battle.
Pitka's wife and daughters with their husbands fled to Sweden in 1944, re-immigrated to Canada in 1948, settled in Vancouver, B.C. and are buried there.

Awards

In January 1920 to give recognition to his activities during the Great War, the KCMG Knight Commander of St. Michael and St. George was awarded to him by King George V. The Estonian government valued his contribution by awarding him the Cross of Liberty I/1. Pitka is also recipient of the Latvian military Order of Lāčplēsis, 2nd class.

Writings
Pitka was also a prolific author. He translated a book by Irving Cooper about fitness and health from English to Estonian in 1935 after he had returned from Canada. He also translated a spiritual work with a foreword by Helena Blavatsky. Pitka wrote about his years commanding the barque Lilly and also wrote his other memoirs in four volumes that were edited by Evald Past.

Pitka, J., Minu Mälestused suure ilmasõja algusest Eesti vabadussõja lõpuni, Tallinna Eesti Kirjastus-Ühisus, 1921
Pitka, J. Teed töelisele tervisele, tõlgitud inglise keelest, author Irving S. Cooper, koostõlkija Saima Smith, Eesti Ühistrükikoda, Tallinn, 1935
Pitka, J., Minu Mälestused I, Laevandus, Kiirtrükk, Tallinn, 1937
Pitka, J., Minu Mälestused II, Laevandus, Tallinn, Ilutrükk, Tartu, 1938.
Pitka, J., Minu Mälestused III, Laevandus, Tallinn, Ilutrükk, Tartu, 1939.
Pitka, J., Minu Mälestused IV, Orkaanis ja dûnglis, Vikerlane, Tallinn, Ilutrükk, Tartu, 1939.
Pitka, J., Väljavõtteid "Kuldsete õpetuste raamatust", avaldanud H.P. Blavatsky, eestitatud J. Pitka, Eesti Ühistrükikoda, Tallinn, 1939.
Pitka, J., Minu Mälestused 1914-1920: Suure Ilmasõja algusest Eesti Vabadussõja lõpuni, Olion, Tallinna Raamatutrükikoda, 1993, [Reprint of his 1921 book.] 
Pitka, J. Teed töelisele tervisele, tõlgitud inglise keelest, author Irving S. Cooper, koostõlkija Saima Smith, Nebadon, Ühiselu, Tallinn, 1994
Pitka, J., Kuldsed aasta "Lillyga", Mats, Tallinna Raamatutrükikoda, 1998,

Disappearance
Pitka returned from Finland to Estonia in spring 1944. In September 1944, when the Germans were retreating from Estonia, Jüri Uluots organized a new Estonian government headed by Otto Tief. Pitka organized the last defence of Tallinn against the advancing Red Army. The circumstances of his disappearance remained unknown for a long time. Several stories relate that he died either in a battle against a Soviet tank group or in the stormy Baltic Sea when trying to make his way to Sweden aboard one of the last small boats fleeing the country. A look into his family tree, however, reveals that on 22 November 1944, Pitka was in combat with a Soviet battalion in Kõue parish. His troops lost the battle, and Pitka committed suicide by injecting a sedating syringe, so as to not fall into the hands of the Soviets alive.

See also

Freikorps in the Baltic
List of people who disappeared

References

External links
Admiral Johan Pitka
Exhibition 2007: Admiral Pitka - 135
Pinn, Voldemar. Admiral Pitka elu ja surm: raamat mehest, kel Eestimaal kaheksa hauda. Tartu: 1993.
Kaevats, Ülo, et al. 2000. Eesti Entsüklopeedia 14. Tallinn: Eesti Entsüklopeediakirjastus, 

1872 births

1944 deaths
Date of death unknown
People from Järva Parish
People from Kreis Jerwen
Estonian People's Party politicians
National Liberal Party (Estonia) politicians
Members of the Estonian Constituent Assembly
Members of the Estonian National Assembly
Estonian anti-communists
Estonian admirals
Estonian military personnel of the Estonian War of Independence
Estonian people of World War II
Recipients of the Cross of Liberty (Estonia)
Recipients of the Military Order of the Cross of the Eagle, Class I
Recipients of the Order of Lāčplēsis, 2nd class
Honorary Knights Commander of the Order of St Michael and St George
1940s missing person cases
Place of death unknown
Missing in action of World War II
Military personnel killed in World War II